Clement Higgins (1844 – 4 December 1916) was a British Liberal Party politician who served as Member of Parliament for Mid Norfolk in the 25th Parliament between 1892 and 1895.

Higgins was first elected at the 1892 general election.

References

External links 
 Clement Higgins on Hansard

1844 births
1916 deaths
UK MPs 1892–1895
Liberal Party (UK) MPs for English constituencies
People from Norfolk
Date of birth missing